Werauhia lyman-smithii is a plant species in the genus Werauhia. This species is endemic to Costa Rica.

References

lyman-smithii
Endemic flora of Costa Rica